Tanta is a city in Egypt with the country's fifth largest populated area and 658,798 inhabitants as of 2018. The capital of Gharbia Governorate, it is a center for the cotton-ginning industry. One of the major railway lines goes through Tanta. Annual festivals are held in Tanta  for one week beginning on 11 October celebrating the birthday of Ahmad al-Badawi, a revered Sufi figure of the 13th century, who founded the Badawiyya Tariqa in Egypt and is buried in Ahmad Al-Badawi Mosque, the main mosque of Tanta. Tanta is known for its sweet shops and roasted chickpeas.

Overview

The older name of the city is Tandata which comes from its Coptic name.

With its large cotton plantations, in 1856, Tanta became a stop on the railway network, primarily for the benefit of exporting its cotton to European markets.  The area around Tanta was mostly fields but Tanta had grown into a large crowded city.

This city is a center of celebration in late October at the end of the cotton harvest. Three million people, from around the Delta and other parts of the Arab world, come for the Moulid of Sayid Ahmed el-Badawi, which is a colorful, religious, eight-day celebration. The moulid is centered around the mosque and tomb of Sayid Ahmad al-Badawi, who founded one of Egypt's largest Sufi orders known as Ahmadiyyah or Badawiyya. He was born in Morocco, but emigrated to Arabia, and later was sent to Tanta in AD 1234 as a representative of the order from Iraq. He was granted permission to start a new order in Tanta and it soon flourished into one of Egypt's largest Sufi brotherhoods.

Tanta is famous for its sweet candy made of gelatin, coconut, sesame,  peanuts, and chickpeas. Large quantities are sold during the mulid festivals when many Egyptians visit the city. The sweets have been considered a delicacy since the 1800s.

Tanta has many cotton processing factories and textile industries, and is also a university town with Tanta University since 1972.

The people of Tanta are called by Egyptian slang .

Sites

 Montazah garden
Tanta stadium
Tanta sporting club
Tanta teachers club
Tanta University
Virgin Mary Coptic Orthodox church, which is over 200 years old
Saint George Cathedral
Saint Peter Catholic basilica
The Museum of Tanta contains items from ancient nearby sites of Sais, Naucratis, and Buto, such as pottery and statues.
El Mahallah is a large industrial town near Tanta, famous for its textiles.

Climate
As all of Egypt, has a hot desert climate (BWh), according to Köppen-Geiger climate classification system.

Notable people 
 Magda al-Sabahi or Magda Sabbahi = Magda  (1931-2020) actress
 Huda Sultan (1925-2006) singer and  actress
 Kamal Amin (1923–1979),   artist
 Mahmoud Zulfikar (1914-1970), Film director
 Khairy Beshara, film director
 Abdu al-Hamuli (‎) (1836–1901), singer
 Mahmoud Khalil Al-Hussary,  (1917–1980) reciter of the Qur'an
 Mohamed Fawzi (1918–1966), composer, singer, and actor
 Naima Akef (1929–1966), actress and circus player
 Doria Shafik (1908–1975), leader of the Women's Liberation Movement in the early 1950s
 Ahmed Hijazi (1936–2011), known as "Hegazy", a caricature artist
 Nasr Abu Zayd (1943–2010), thinker and  liberal theologian 
 Ahmed Khaled Tawfik (1962–2018), author
 Amina Rizk (1910–2003), actress
 El-Sayed Nosseir (1905–1977), Olympic Gold medal winner in weightlifting
 Hilana Sedarous first female Egyptian doctor and first female Egyptian gynaecologist
 Maximos V Hakim, Melkite Greek Catholic Patriarch
 Nabil Farouk, novelist

See also

 List of cities and towns in Egypt
 Nile Delta
 Egyptian festivals

References

External links

 Egypt: Handbook for Travellers : Part First, Lower Egypt, with the Fayum and the Peninsula of Sinai by Karl Baedeker (1885)
 Families as We are: Conversations from Around the World by Perdita Huston, 2001
 The Encyclopædia Britannica: a dictionary of arts, sciences, literature and general information by Hugh Chisholm, 1910
 The Coptic Diocese of Tanta

Governorate capitals in Egypt
Populated places in Gharbia Governorate
Nile Delta
Cities in Egypt
Religious festivals in Egypt